Salvatore Tavano (born 13 March 1980 in Siracusa) is an Italian racing driver, winner of the TCR Italy Touring Car Championship 2018, 2019 and 2020 [2] and who has had several seasons in the WTCC, ETCC and TCR Italy championships.

Career
After starting his competitive career in karting, Tavano spent two years in the Italian Formula 3 championship. He finished fourth in 1998 and third in 1999. In 2001 he participated in the European Formula 3000 championship, winning the Zolder race and closing the season. with fourth place in the overall standings. In 2005 he finished third in the Italian super-tourism championship. Since 2002 he has spent three years driving in the European Touring Car Championship.

He participated in some rounds of the 2005 World Touring Championship for the DB Motorsport team. In 2006 he competed again in the WTCC for N. Technology on an Alfa Romeo 156, obtaining a victory and finishing the season in eighteenth position. [3]

In 2007 he competed in the Le Mans Series in the GT1 class with a Saleen S7R.

In 2008 he took part in the Italian GT Championship at the wheel of a Ferrari F430 GT2 from the Advanced Eng team. He finished fourth overall with 3 wins. In the same year he participated in two races of the GT OPEN championship, always with a Ferrari F430 GT2 of the Advanced Eng team, obtaining a victory.

In 2009 he took part in the 500 Abarth Trophy Championship, becoming Italian Champion with eleven seasonal victories. He won the opportunity to participate in the 500 Abarth trophy European final, winning the victory.

In 2010 he took part in the SEAT Leon Supercopa Italia championship, finishing third with three seasonal victories.

In 2011 he participated in 5 races of the Italian GT Championship at the wheel of a Porsche GT3, obtaining 3 victories.

From 2009 to 2011 he also participated in some stages of the Mountain Speed ​​Trophy obtaining excellent placings.

In 2012 he participated in some races of the Renault Cup Italy with a Clio Cup, obtaining 2 victories out of 6 seasonal participations.

In 2013 he became Vice Champion of the Mini Italia Trophy, obtaining 4 seasonal victories with his Mini Cooper S.

From 2013 to 2017 he was a pilot-tester for the L.R.M Motors team where he is responsible for Development and Testing. From 2016 to 2017 he is also coach driver for the L.R.M. Motors for a driver participating in the SEAT Leon Cup Italia Trophy. In the same year he began his collaboration with SEAT Motorsport Italia as Coordinator in charge of safe and sporty driving instructors and as a test driver.

in 2018, with the birth of the CUPRA brand, the collaboration with Scuderia del Girasole by CUPRA Racing (formerly SEAT Motorsport Italia) begins as Coordinator in charge of safe and sporty driving instructors and as a test driver. It is in this year that he obtains the first TCR Italy Italian Champion Title.

In 2019, to the activity of coordinator and driver he adds that of Tester Development Manager SEAT Cupra ST Cup Italia, Team Manager for Scuderia del Girasole cars in the Italian TCR DSG Endurance Championship. He was chosen as a coach for the Youtester blog and CONI awarded him the Medal for athletic value CONI Italy. He wins the title of TCR Italy Italian Champion with one race in advance.

In 2020 he continues his commitment as instructor coordinator and as tester for the new CUPRA Leon Competicion which he manages to bring to his first historic victory. For the third consecutive year he is Italian Champion TCR Italy.

In 2021 he is at his fourth participation in the Italian TCR Championship always with a CUPRA, he closes the season with an overall third place, winning three seasonal victories. Alongside his activity on the track he is always the coordinator of the instructors for safe and sporty driving.

Racing record

Complete Italian/Euro Formula 3000 results
(key) (Races in bold indicate pole position; races in italics indicate fastest lap)

Complete World Touring Car Championship results
(key) (Races in bold indicate pole position) (Races in italics indicate fastest lap)

References

External links
Official Site.

1980 births
Living people
Italian racing drivers
Italian Formula Three Championship drivers
Auto GP drivers
World Touring Car Championship drivers
European Le Mans Series drivers
European Touring Car Championship drivers
European Touring Car Cup drivers
TCR Europe Touring Car Series drivers